Anna Jordaens (20 December 1927 – 1996) was a Belgian gymnast. She competed in the women's artistic team all-around at the 1948 Summer Olympics.

References

External links
 

1927 births
1996 deaths
Belgian female artistic gymnasts
Olympic gymnasts of Belgium
Gymnasts at the 1948 Summer Olympics
People from Mortsel
Sportspeople from Antwerp Province